The blue lyretail (Fundulopanchax gardneri), also known as the Gardner's killi and formerly as the steel-blue aphyosemion. It is a species of killifish endemic to freshwater habitats in Nigeria and Cameroon.

Description
Blue lyretails are sexually dimorphic. The males are more colourful than the females and have wavy lines of red spots which run along its body. The outer margins of the dorsal, anal and caudal fins are tinted with yellow. The females are less brightly coloured and have brown spots rather than red.

Distribution
The blue lyretail inhabits the tributary streams and marshes of the Benue and Cross River basins of Nigeria and Cameroon.

Habitat and biology
The blue lyretail occurs in both savanna and forested regions. The males are larger, more colourful and have larger extendable fins than the females. The males are territorial. The waterbodies in which this species occurs are of an unpredictable nature and it has evolved a spawning strategy which is frequently referred to as a "switch" or "semi-annual" breeding strategy. This means that the eggs can survive a period of drying but that they are also viable when permanently submerged. Submerged eggs normally hatch in around 14–21 days depending on the temperature of the water. The eggs are laid on the bottom.

Taxonomy and subspecies 
There are several valid subspecies:
 Blue lyretail – Fundulopanchax gardneri gardneri (Boulenger, 1911)
 Ejagham killi – Fundulopanchax gardneri lacustris (Langton, 1974)
 Mamfe killi – Fundulopanchax gardneri mamfensis (Radda, 1974)
 Nigerian killi – Fundulopanchax gardneri nigerianus (Clausen, 1963)

Fundulopanchax gardneri was described as Fundulus gardneri in 1911 by George Albert Boulenger with the type locality given as Okwoga in the headwaters of Cross River, Nigeria. The type was collected by a Captain R.D. Gardner who is honoured in the specific name.

Human uses
Blue lyretails are harvested for the aquarium trade. They are apparently easy to maintain and breed although the males can be aggressive to other slower moving species.
Gardner’s killifish are generally kept in species-only tank, as they social are prone to becoming sexually frustrated in the lack of females, where then they will attempt to mate with often unrelated tankmates

See also 
 List of freshwater aquarium fish species

References 

 UNEP-WCMC Protected Areas Programme – Vallée de Mai Nature Reserve

Blue lyretail
Fish described in 1911
Taxa named by George Albert Boulenger